The Exeed VX (code project M36T) is a mid-size crossover SUV made by Chery's premium subdivision Exeed, revealed in September 2020.

Overview

The Exeed VX was originally previewed by the Exeed VX Concept revealed during the 2019 Guangzhou Auto Show in November 2019. The concept previews a midsize crossover SUV significantly larger than the Exeed TX midsize crossover and features hidden door handles. 

The production version is near identical to the concept minus the hidden door handles, and was revealed during the 2020 Beijing Auto Show in September 2020 with sales to officially start in March 2021. The VX is positioned as the flagship SUV of the Exeed brand. 

As of early January 2021 the Exeed VX was announced with an additional Chinese name called the Lanyue (揽月). 

The dimensions of the Exeed VX measure // (length/width/height), with a wheelbase of  positioning it just above the Exeed TX. The Exeed VX can seat up to 7 people in 2+3+2 configuration. Prices start from 180,000 yuan.

Powertrain
The VX can be had with a 1.6-litre turbo engine, or a 2.0-litre TGDI engine., and 7-speed dual-clutch transmission.

See also
Exeed TX
Exeed LX

References

Cars of China
Cars introduced in 2019
2020s cars
Mid-size sport utility vehicles
Crossover sport utility vehicles
Front-wheel-drive vehicles
All-wheel-drive vehicles